Bilkovo is a rural locality (a village) in Nikolskoye Rural Settlement, Kaduysky District, Vologda Oblast, Russia. The population was 4 as of 2002.

Geography 
Bilkovo is located 37 km north of Kaduy (the district's administrative centre) by road. Buzykino is the nearest rural locality.

References 

Rural localities in Kaduysky District